Jacob Adams Kohler was a Republican politician from the state of Ohio. He was Ohio Attorney General from 1886 to 1887.

Biography
Kohler was born August 15, 1835, at Reading, Pennsylvania. When he was four months old, his family moved to Franklin Township, Summit County, Ohio. He received a public education and went to Lodi Academy. In 1859, he was admitted to the bar, and served as Prosecuting Attorney of Summit County two terms. His first law partner was Sidney Edgerton. Kohler married Frances H. Coburn May 16, 1860, and had two sons.

In 1883 he was elected to the Ohio House of Representatives for the Sixty-sixth General Assembly. In 1885 he was elected Ohio Attorney General. In 1895, he was elected a Common Pleas Court Judge.

He died March 15, 1916, at his Akron home.

Notes

References

People from Summit County, Ohio
Ohio Attorneys General
Ohio lawyers
Republican Party members of the Ohio House of Representatives
1835 births
1916 deaths
County district attorneys in Ohio
19th-century American politicians
Politicians from Akron, Ohio
19th-century American lawyers